William Dabbs Blanks (April 3, 1864 – February 6, 1921) was an American Democratic politician who served as a member of the Virginia Senate, representing the state's 25th district.

References

External links

1864 births
1921 deaths
Democratic Party Virginia state senators
20th-century American politicians
People from Clarksville, Virginia